Julia Skupchenko (born May 17, 1990) is a Dutch entrepreneur of Russian origin and innovator who connects social entrepreneurs, experts and companies in sustainable business initiatives. She is the co-founder of AlterContacts, the Think Tank for Sustainable Development.

In 2020 she launched the Lockdown Economy, the United Nations registered nonprofit grassroots movement to help small businesses and self-employed overcome the challenges of the COVID-19 pandemic. In June 2021, Julia presented the insights from the Lockdown Economy at the United Nations Conference on Micro, Small and Medium Enterprises.

She was awarded Gold as "Hero of the Year Helping Others During COVID-19" at the Women's World Awards 2020, Silver as the Female Innovator of the Year 2020 at the 17th annual Stevie Awards for Women in Business, and Gold as the Thought Leader of the Year 2021 at the 18th annual Stevie Awards for Women in Business.

Early life and education 

Skupchenko was born and raised in the Komi Republic, in the Arctic region of Russia. She holds a bachelor's degree in Circumpolar Sciences from the University of Nordland (Norway), and two master's degrees from the Syktyvkar State University in International Relations and in Political Sciences. She received several grants, including the North2North Mobility grant to study abroad in Norway (2010), Canada (2011) and Sweden (2013).

Research 
During the years of higher education (2007-2014) she presented her research work on the Sustainable Development of the Arctic at more than fifty conferences. In 2009, Skupchenko was the youngest diplomat to represent Russia at the international G20 Youth Summit in Paris, addressing the challenges of the economic crisis.

In 2013 as an early career researcher, Skupchenko co-chaired a session on “Arctic People and Resources: Opportunities, Challenges and Risks” during the Arctic Science Summit Week (ASSW) in Krakow, Poland. After which she became an International Research Associate at the Canadian Polar Commission. In 2016, Skupchenko co-authored two articles for the Encyclopedia of the Barents Region.

Since co-founding of the Think Tank AlterContacts in 2019, Julia has been leading research on SDG and small businesses. In June 2021 at the United Nations Conference on MSMEs, she presented the insights on entrepreneurship during the pandemic based on the Lockdown Economy, the field research from across 5 continents, 41 countries and 78 business activities.

Professional career 
At the age of 22, at the Arctic Frontiers conference in Norway, Skupchenko was recruited by Royal Dutch Shell and moved to the Netherlands. At Shell she was responsible for communications, mitigation of risks to local communities and environment, and third-party advocacy of the Arctic campaign for two consecutive years.

After leaving her corporate position, Skupchenko remained in the Netherlands and became an entrepreneur. For one of her clients, she co-authored an internally published playbook about best practices on how to run digital innovation for a multinational corporation with over 30,000 employees.

Since 2019, Skupchenko is a guest writer for Entrepreneur.com, the leading online magazine for businesses. The same year she was a mentor in the Artificial Intelligence program at Rockstart Accelerator.

In 2019 Julia co-founded AlterContacts, the Think Tank for Sustainable Development in Amsterdam, the Netherlands with the main mission of empowering entrepreneurship and eradicating ignorance.

In 2020 Think Tank AlterContacts launched AlterContacts Academy for Sustainable Development. In 2021 it was registered as a partner of the United Nations Higher Education Sustainability Initiative. Its main program, Lockdown Economy Challenge, aims to train students in Sustainable and Innovative Entrepreneurship. It is an SDG-focused co-curricular program for tertiary education students: action-based learning where they address real-life challenges, specifically economic crises caused by the pandemic, as part of broader education for SDG.

Response to the COVID-19 pandemic 
In 2020 during the pan-European Hackathon #EUvsVirus, together with the experts of the Think Tank, Skupchenko proposed to the European Commission a way to strengthen the economic resilience of self-employed professionals affected by the pandemic.

The same year, Skupchenko launched the Lockdown Economy, the United Nations registered nonprofit grassroots movement to help small businesses and self-employed overcome the challenges of the COVID-19 pandemic. In 2021 she gave a TED talk  based on the Lockdown Economy story highlighting the role of small businesses in reactivating the economy.

In March 2021, the Lockdown Economy became the finalist from the Netherlands in the Charlemagne Youth Prize 2021-for its impact on international collaboration. The UN Department of Social and Economic Affairs has registered Lockdown Economy as one of the SDG Good Practices, Success Stories and Lessons Learned. The initiative has become one of the "inspiring breakthroughs and success stories that are showing results and impacts all over the world, and several good practices can be replicated and scaled up to address existing gaps and constraints. In June 2021, Julia presented the insights from the Lockdown Economy at the United Nations Conference on Micro, Small and Medium Enterprises.

Social impact 
For helping over 8000 entrepreneurs worldwide to get ideas on how to save their business, in October 2020, the team of the Lockdown Economy, led by Julia Skupchenko and Massimo Mercuri, was named the Gold Winner in the category "Hero of the Year | Helping Others During COVID-19" at the 13th Annual 2020 Women in Business and the Professions World Awards®.

Awards and recognition 
On 30 March 2021, the Lockdown Economy initiative was chosen by the European Parliament as the national finalist from the Netherlands for the European Charlemagne Youth Prize 2021. For its contribution to promoting European and international understanding and providing role models for young people living in Europe and offer practical examples of Europeans living together as one community. Lockdown Economy initiative is also nominated for iF SOCIAL IMPACT PRIZE which aims to publish and support projects that contribute to our society.

In September 2021, the 18th annual Stevie Awards for Women in Business honored Julia as Gold Stevie Award Winner in four categories:

 Woman of the Year 2021
 Female Thought Leader of the Year 2021
 Female Executive of the Year 2021
 Mentor or Coach of the Year 2021

Additionally, Julia was named the winner of a Silver Stevie® Award in two categories Female Innovator of the Year and Most Innovative Woman of the Year. She was also awarded the Bronze as the Social Change Maker of the Year.

Julia was also nominated for by the World Economic Forum as a Young Global Leader 2022.[27]

On October 2, 2020, the 17th annual Stevie Awards for Women in Business named Julia Skupchenko the winner of
 The Silver Stevie® Award as the Female Innovator of the Year
 The Silver Stevie® Award as the Mentor of the Year
 The Bronze Stevie® Award as the Most Innovative Woman of the Year
 The Bronze Stevie® Award as the Woman of the Year 2020.
On 10 September 2020, Think Tank AlterContacts was named the winner of a Bronze Stevie® Award as a Non-profit Organization of the Year 2020 in The 17th Annual International Business Awards®.

On 20 October 2020, Think Tank AlterContacts was named the Bronze winner as the Startup of the Year 2020 in the 13th Annual 2020 Women in Business and the Professions World Awards®.

In 2021 Think Tank AlterContacts received Silver Award as a Non-Profit Organization of the Year and the Grand Award at the 18th Annual Stevie® Awards for Women in Business, an international competition.

Selected publications 

 Book “Lockdown Economy Nepal: Unity and cooperation to overcome the pandemic
Book “Lockdown Economy Middle East: Weathering the pandemic as a community
Book "Lockdown Economy Netherlands: The makers’ journey through the pandemic
Skupchenko J. (2021) “How to Scale A Sustainable Non-profit Initiative On Zero-Budget”. In Online Magazine The Helm, Business Leaders in their Own Words
 Skupchenko J. (2020) “Don't be a Bystander: How to Save Small Businesses in Europe”. In Online Magazine Entrepreneur.com.
 Skupchenko J. (2020) “Is Your Business Idea Ready to Get Funded?”. In Online Magazine Entrepreneur.com.
 Skupchenko J. (2020) “How COVID-19 Sparked Innovative Entrepreneurship on the Pan-European Scale”. In Online Magazine Entrepreneur.com.
 Skupchenko J. (2020) “How to Keep Mental Health and Entrepreneurial Drive in the Time of Pandemic”. In Online Magazine Entrepreneur.com.  
Skupchenko J. (2020) “Simple Principles of the 'New Entrepreneurs'”. In Online Magazine Entrepreneur.com.
 Skupchenko J. (2019) “What Makes Women Entrepreneurs Fail or Stand Out”. In Online Magazine Entrepreneur.com.  
Skupchenko J. (2019) “How to Innovate in a Small Family Store to Avoid Bankruptcy”. In Online Magazine Entrepreneur.com.

Academic publications 

 Skupchenko J. (2013) The Implementation of the Bologna Process in Russia. In Rogozina I. (ed.) Multicultural World: challenges of understanding, p. 81-90. Syktyvkar State University Publishing. ISBN 978-5-87237-940-9
 Skupchenko J. (2012) The impact of the development of oil and gas resources on the security situation in the Arctic. In Arctic Frontiers 2012 - Abstract Book, Part III: p. 100.
 Skupchenko J. (2011) International Tourism in the Komi Republic under the Impact of Climate Change [in Russian]. In People and Environment, XXI Republican Scientific Conference: p. 165-166. Syktyvkar, Russia
 Skupchenko J. (2010) International tourism development in the conditions of global climate change. In Collection of Reports of the Xth Regional Youth Scientific Conference Socio-Economic, Political and Legal Basis of State Government, p. 140-143. Publishing of the Komi Republic Academy of Governance and Management. Syktyvkar, Russia  
 Skupchenko J. (2009) Development of International Tourism in the North [in Russian]. In The History and Culture of the Russian North and the countries of Northern Europe from the ancient times till present day, p. 150-159. Arkhangelsk, Russia

References

External links 
Official website of the Think Tank AlterContacts
Official website of Lockdown Economy
TED talk of Julia Skupchenko “Behind every small business, there is a story” 
Julia Skupchenko on LinkedIn

21st-century Dutch businesswomen
21st-century Dutch businesspeople
21st-century Russian women
Harvard Business School alumni
Syktyvkar State University alumni
Russian expatriates in the Netherlands
Living people
1990 births